D23 state road, connects cities and towns of Duga Resa, Josipdol and Senj, to the state road network of Croatia, and most notably to  A1 motorway in Žuta Lokva interchange, as well as two major state roads - D3 and D8, located at the northern terminus and the southern terminus of the road respectively. The route comprises a significant number of urban intersections, in segments of the road running through Duga Resa and Senj.

The D23 state road runs parallel to a section of the A1 motorway between Karlovac and Žuta Lokva interchanges, thus serving as an alternate or backup route for the motorway. Additionally, A7 motorway route is planned along the D23 road between Senj and Žuta Lokva. Once that motorway is completed, the D23 road shall run parallel to either A1 or A7 motorway along its entire length.

The road, as well as all other state roads in Croatia, is managed and maintained by Hrvatske ceste, a state-owned company.

History 

Vratnik pass, currently a part of the D23 road, was already in use during Roman time as a salt road, and it became important for timber and other goods in the Middle Ages. However, the first well documented road built along the route was Via Josephina named after Joseph II, Holy Roman Emperor who commissioned its construction in 1775. Latin inscriptions carved in rock along the original Via Josephina route completed in 1779 testify that the Emperor travelled through the Vratnik pass on horseback when he realized that the route between Senj, as a major fortress on Adriatic coast, and the hinterland was nearly impassable. Legend has it that this happened when he fell from his horse near Vratnik Pass. Even though the incident is impossible to verify, the town of Josipdol to the east of the mountain pass is named after the Holy Roman Emperor.

The original route comprised very steep sections and 20% inclines were not uncommon. There was even one climb at a 30% grade. The first reconstruction was carried out as early as late 18th century, and another one between 1833 and 1845 managed by Field Marshal Josef Philipp Vukassovich and Josip Kajetan Knežić respectively. Subsequent modifications were not as significant. The road was paved in 1950, when the last minor modifications of the route were executed.

The route was distinguished by mile markers along the route, an obelisk in Karlovac marking the beginning of the road and a specially built gate in Senj marking its end. Most remarkably the original road included a stone bridge across three spans in Tounj, which was expanded during the reconstruction of 1845 and now has two levels. The upper level was destroyed during World War II, but it was rebuilt in the 1950s.

Traffic volume 

Traffic is regularly counted and reported by Hrvatske ceste, operator of the road. Substantial variations between annual (AADT) and summer (ASDT) traffic volumes are attributed to the fact that the road serves as a connection to A1 motorway and D8 state road carrying substantial tourist traffic.

Road junctions and populated areas

See also
 Highways in Croatia
 Autocesta Rijeka - Zagreb
 Hrvatske autoceste

Maps

Sources

D023
D023
D023